Wayne Warren (born 12 June 1962) is a Welsh professional darts player who plays in events of the World Darts Federation (WDF). He was the last ever BDO World Darts Champion. He is the oldest player to become world champion.

Darts career

BDO
Warren qualified for the 2005 BDO World Darts Championship, where he was the only Welshman in the field. He lost 3–0 in the first round to third seed Mervyn King. Warren has come close to qualifying for Lakeside on two occasions, falling two games short of qualifying for the 2008 World Championship in a loss to Mike Veitch who eventually qualified, and then falling at the same hurdle again in the qualifiers for the 2009 World Championship, losing to Robbie Green. Warren fell two games short once more of qualifying for the 2010 World Championship, losing to Irishman Martin McCloskey who eventually qualified.

Warren's best TV performance came in the 2015 BDO World Trophy, where he reached the quarter-finals, beating Madars Razma 6–4 and 2015 World Champion Scott Mitchell with ease 7–2. He fell at the Last-8 stage, losing a close game with Jeff Smith 8–7.

Warren also qualified for the 2013 World Championship, but lost in the first round to Alan Norris.

In 2014, Warren won the BDO Gold Cup, beating Pip Blackwell in the final three sets to nil.

Warren reached the quarter-final of the 2018 World Championship, beating Wesley Harms 3–1 in an impressive showing in the 1st round; in the 2nd round, after a tough start, he defeated Willem Mandigers 4–2 to set up a quarter-final match against Mark McGeeney. Warren led McGeeney 4–3 in sets and led the eighth by a break of throw, but McGeeney took the set to a deciding leg, in which Warren hit a double-one attempting to hit a single 20 that would have given him one match dart. McGeeney won the set and ultimately the match 5–4.

At the 2020 World Championship, Warren improved on his best performance by reaching the final, and beat fellow Welshman Jim Williams 7–4 to win the BDO world title. At 57, Warren was the oldest winner of either version of the world championship. His prize winning fee of £23,000 was the lowest awarded to a world champion since 1989, as a result of the BDO's financial difficulties which led to it going into liquidation later in the year. Warren is therefore the last player to win the BDO version of the world championship, and became the World Darts Federation's number one ranked player as a result of his victory.

Style of play
Fellow players and commentators have commented on Warren's smooth and relaxing throwing style.

Personal life
Warren is an active player on the darts exhibition circuit.

Away from darts, Warren works as a roofer and lives in Tynewydd, Rhondda Cynon Taf. He is sponsored by Red Dragon Darts.

In 2001, Warren was involved in an incident in which he was splashed with boiling chip fat – suffering 20% upper body burns which gave him heavy scarring.

World Championship performances

BDO/WDF
 2005: First round (lost to Mervyn King 0–3)
 2013: First round (lost to Alan Norris 1–3)
 2018: Quarter-finals (lost to Mark McGeeney 4–5)
 2019: Second round (lost to Michael Unterbuchner 0–4)
 2020: Winner (beat Jim Williams 7–4)
 2022: Third round (lost to Cameron Menzies 0-3)

Career finals

BDO major finals: 1 (1 title)

Performance timeline

References

External links
Wayne Warren Profile, results and stats Profile on Mastercaller.com
Wayne Warren Profile and stats Darts Database

1962 births
Living people
Welsh darts players
British Darts Organisation players
BDO world darts champions
Sportspeople from Cardiff